D&R electronica Weesp BV is a Dutch company based in Weesp that produces professional audio mixers founded by Duco de Rijk and Ronnie Goene

History
D&R was founded on February 1, 1972 by Duco de Rijk and Ronnie Goene in Amsterdam the two founders were members of the popular band Zen at the time. Their aim was to design and manufacture affordable and high quality mixing desks. At first the main market were PA mixers. After that, D&R went into the studio recording sector and the world of broadcasting.
D&R started in a private address and then moved to a canal side property on the Keizersgracht in Amsterdam and then In 1979, D&R moved to a new location in the west of Amsterdam and again in 1985 to a large building located in Weesp, eastern Amsterdam.

Growth
In 1984, D&R launched the larger in-line mixing consoles. At the time D&R was exporting to 30 countries and the staff grew from 15 to 30 and later on when the staff became consisting of 35 members D&R had to move again to a bigger location so they moved in 1985 to the North industrial estate in Weesp.

References

USA Master Distributor is Progressive Concepts at 305 South Bartlett Road, Streamwood, IL 60107. (630)736-9822

External links
 

Audio mixing console manufacturers
Audio equipment manufacturers of the Netherlands
Manufacturing companies based in Amsterdam
Music in Amsterdam